Santiago y Zaraíche is a village and a district in Murcia, Spain. It is part of the municipality of Murcia. It has an area of 2 and shares borders with the main city by its south. 10,791 people lived in the district in 2020.

References

Murcia
Populated places in the Region of Murcia